Satview Broadband is a cable television Multiple System Operator in the United States, with franchise cable television systems in the State of Nevada. Satview offers Video, High-Speed Internet and Telephone Service in   Topaz Lake, Wells and Carlin Nevada. Its systems in Battle Mountain, Elko were sold to Zito Media.  Its systems in Colorado and New Mexico were divested in 2015.
The operator serves mainly rural towns and cities. It has cable franchises in Elko and Douglas, counties in Nevada.

Satview is headquartered in Reno, Nevada.

In Nevada the company operates in the cities of Elko, Carlin,  Jackpot and Wells, Topaz Lake.
In the state of Colorado Satview has the Cable system in Springfield

Service areas
Carlin
Jackpot
Topaz Lake
Wells
Spring Creek,

Services
 Cable Internet
 Cable television
 Dedicated Internet service
 Fiber optic cable facilities
 Telephone
 Digital cable
 Pay-per-view
 Data transport

External links
corporate website

Companies based in Reno, Nevada
Cable television companies of the United States